Antonella Terenzi (born 28 December 1965) is a former synchronized swimmer from Italy. She competed in the women's solo competition at the 1984 Summer Olympics.

References 

1965 births
Living people
Italian synchronized swimmers
Olympic synchronized swimmers of Italy
Synchronized swimmers at the 1984 Summer Olympics